Principle of parity is a legal concept used in codecision procedure that disables one European institution from making decisions without obtaining assent from any other institutions engaged in the procedure.

External links
 European Commission - Codecision procedure

Legal concepts